Kim Jung-su (born July 7, 1981) is a South Korean bobsledder who has competed since 2006. At the 2010 Winter Olympics in Vancouver, he finished 19th in the four-man event.

Kim finished 30th in the two-man event at the FIBT World Championships 2009 in Lake Placid, New York. His best World Cup finish was 26th in the two-man event at Whistler, British Columbia in 2009.

Education
 Jeonju University
 Jeonbuk Sports High School

References

External links
 
 

1981 births
Bobsledders at the 2010 Winter Olympics
Living people
Olympic bobsledders of South Korea
South Korean male bobsledders
Jeonju University alumni
Sportspeople from North Jeolla Province